Episode II, Episode 2 or Episode Two may refer to:

 Episode II (album), an album by Safri Duo
 Episode II (EP), an EP by Eiffel 65
 "Episode 2" (song), a song by Dragon Ash
 "Episode 2" (Ashes to Ashes), an episode of Ashes to Ashes
 Episode 2 (Humans series 1), an episode of Humans
 "Series 1: Episode 2" (Life on Mars), an episode of Life on Mars
 "Episode 2" (Twin Peaks), an episode of Twin Peaks
 Episode 2 (The Casual Vacancy), (2015), the second episode of the TV miniseries The Casual Vacancy
 Half-Life 2: Episode Two, a computer game sequel
 Star Wars: Episode II – Attack of the Clones, a 2002 film
 "Second Episode", the second episode of the HBO series The New Pope

See also